KSAL may refer to:

 KSAL (AM), a radio station (1150 AM) licensed to Salina, Kansas, United States
 KSAL-FM, a radio station (104.9 FM) licensed to Salina, Kansas, United States